Trento is an Italian city.

Trento may also refer to:

Places
 Province of Trento, an Italian province
 Trento, Agusan del Sur, a municipality in the Philippines
 Trento-class cruiser, an Italian heavy cruiser

Other uses
 Denis Trento (born 1982), Italian ski mountaineer
 University of Trento, Italy
 Trento DOC, an appellation for white and rosé sparkling wine made in Trentino, Italy